Marius Laux (born 7 February 1986) is a retired German footballer who last played for 1. FC Köln II. In December 2021, Laux ended his playing career and became the team manager of 1. FC Köln's senior team.

References

External links
 

1986 births
Living people
German footballers
Association football midfielders
3. Liga players
Regionalliga players
1. FC Köln II players
Kickers Offenbach players
1. FC Saarbrücken players
1. FC Köln non-playing staff
People from Limburg an der Lahn
Sportspeople from Giessen (region)
Footballers from Hesse